The 2006 Grand Prix SAR La Princesse Lalla Meryem was a women's tennis tournament played on outdoor clay courts in Rabat, Morocco that was part of the Tier IV category of the 2006 WTA Tour. It was the sixth edition of the tournament and was held from 15 May until 21 May 2006. Unseeded Meghann Shaughnessy won the singles title and earned $22,900 first-prize money.

Finals

Singles
 Meghann Shaughnessy defeated  Martina Suchá 6–2, 3–6, 6–3
 It was Shaughnessy' 1st singles title of the year and the 4th of her career.

Doubles
 Yan Zi /  Zheng Jie defeated  Ashley Harkleroad /  Bethanie Mattek 6–1, 6–3

External links
 ITF tournament edition details
 Tournament draws

Grand Prix Sar La Princesse Lalla Meryem
Morocco Open
2006 in Moroccan tennis